The Palazzo Dondini Ghiselli  is a Neoclassical-style palace located on Via Barberia #23, corner with Via Mario Finzi, in central Bologna, region of Emilia-Romagna, Italy.

History
The palace was designed by Alfonso Torreggiani; with a facade completed in 1753. In 1773, the grand entry staircase was built by Giangiacomo Dotti, with statues by Antonio Schiassi and a fresco of the Aurora by Pietro Fabri. The elevated garden behind the Via Barberia facade, and overlooking the Piazza Malpighi was once a stable built in 1612 by Pietro Fiorini.

The palace once had landscape frescoes by Vincenzo Martinelli and quadratura by Petronio Fancelli.

References

Houses completed in the 18th century
Dondini Ghiselli
Neoclassical architecture in Bologna
18th-century architecture in Italy